Pat McDevitt is an Irish bridge player.

Bridge accomplishments

Wins

 World Senior Pairs Championship (1) 2010
 North American Bridge Championships (4)
 Senior Knockout Teams (1) 2000 
 Rockwell Mixed Pairs (1) 2012 
 Truscott Senior Swiss Teams (1) 2007 
 von Zedtwitz Life Master Pairs (1) 2005

Runners-up

 North American Bridge Championships (3)
 Senior Knockout Teams (2) 2003, 2008 
 Truscott Senior Swiss Teams (1) 2008

Notes

External links

Irish contract bridge players
Living people
Year of birth missing (living people)